The Garmin G3000 (and G2000/G5000) is an avionics system designed by Garmin Aviation for light turbine aircraft. The integrated touchscreen system, containing multiple glass cockpit displays, for operating a synthetic vision system, and a three-dimensional displayed rendering of terrain.  The G3000 was unveiled at the NBAA Convention in 2009.

On 30 October 2019, Garmin announced that the Piper M600 and Cirrus Vision Jet would become the first general aviation aircraft certified with the company's emergency Autoland system, intended to automatically land the aircraft in an emergency. The Autoland system rolled out on 18 May 2020, and is dubbed "Autonomí" by Garmin. In June 2021, it won the Collier Trophy for "the greatest achievement in aeronautics or astronautics in America" for 2020.

Applications

G2000
 Cessna Corvalis TTx

G3000

 Cessna Citation CJ3+/M2
 Cirrus Vision SF50
 Daher TBM 930/TBM 940
 Diamond DART Series
 Embraer Phenom 100 and 300
 Heart ES-19
 Honda HA-420 HondaJet
 Piper M600
Northrop F-5AT

G5000
 Cessna Citation Latitude
 Cessna Citation Longitude
 Cessna Citation Sovereign+
 Cessna Citation X+
 Cessna Citation XLS (retrofit)
 Hawker 400 (retrofit)
 Learjet 70/75
 Eviation Alice

G5000H
 Bell 525 Relentless

See also

References

Aircraft instruments
Avionics
Garmin
Glass cockpit
2009 introductions